1979 Madrid bombing may refer to:

May 1979 Madrid bombing
July 1979 Madrid bombings